Wolfgang Nešković (born 3 June 1948, in Lübeck) is a German politician, former judge at the German Federal Court of Justice and an independent member of the German Federal Parliament, representing Cottbus – Spree-Neiße. He was a representative of the party The Left, and prior to that, Bündnis '90/Die Grünen as well as the Social Democratic Party of Germany.

Works
Nešković, Wolfgang (ed.). Der CIA-Folterreport: Der offizielle Bericht des US-Senats zum Internierungs- und Verhörprogramm der CIA. Frankfurt: Westend, 2015,  (German translation of the Committee Study of the Central Intelligence Agency's Detention and Interrogation Program)

See also
List of German Left Party politicians

References

External links

1948 births
Living people
Politicians from Lübeck
The Left (Germany) politicians
20th-century German judges
German people of Serbian descent
Members of the Bundestag for Brandenburg
Members of the Bundestag 2009–2013
Members of the Bundestag 2005–2009
Jurists from Schleswig-Holstein
Judges of the Federal Court of Justice